Jacques Berthelet (24 October 1934 – 25 January 2019) was a Canadian Roman Catholic bishop.

Berthelet was born in Canada and was ordained to the priesthood in 1962. He was Superior General of the Clerics of Saint Viator from 1984 to 1986. He served as titular bishop of Lamsorti and as auxiliary bishop of the Roman Catholic Diocese of Saint-Jean-Longueuil, Canada, from 1986 to 1996 and then as bishop of the diocese from 1996 to 2010.

Notes

1934 births
2019 deaths
20th-century Roman Catholic bishops in Canada
21st-century Roman Catholic bishops in Canada
Roman Catholic bishops of Saint-Jean-Longueuil